Acleris rubi is a species of moth of the family Tortricidae. It is found in South Africa.

The larvae feed on Rubus rigidus.

References

Endemic moths of South Africa
Moths described in 2005
rubi
Moths of Africa